This is a list of villages in Nalbari district, an administrative district in the state of Assam, India.

Bllelbeli, Nalbari

Borigog Banbhag

Paschim Nalbari

Madhupur

Tihu

Barbhag

Barkhetri

See also
 Nalbari

Villages in Nalbari district